The Left is a left-wing nationalist and eurosceptic political party in North Macedonia founded on 14 November 2015. Led by Dimitar Apasiev, a Docent of Law at the Goce Delčev University of Štip, the party is anti-NATO and promotes anti-clericalism, anti-fascism, anti-imperialism, and socialism, sitting on the left wing of the political spectrum.

The Left has been described by some academics and news outlets as far left, populist, and "fascist" for adopting some right-wing policies. Reasoning include not being a proper left-wing populist party because it lacks their inclusivity, contradictions between official party platform and social media posts by Apasiev, and its perceived fascism being characterized as "a distorted form of left authoritarianism" due to its strong populism, which is reflected and utilized at all levels, and is notable even among populists.

Foundation and ideology 
The Left says that it was formed by three principal movements: the Communist Party of Macedonia, the movement Solidarity, and the Movement for Social Justice "Lenka", which its parliamentary leader Dimitar Apasiev belongs to. It defines itself as a party advocating labour rights and social justice, while opposing "inter-ethnic barriers" and ethnic nationalism. Its party statute lists a "movement towards socialism", socialist patriotism, anti-imperialism, and secularism as its founding values. Internally, the party has declared its intention to structure itself along the lines of democratic centralism.

Nationalism and minority rights 
The Left has spoken out against Albanian nationalism in North Macedonia and has opposed the expansion of the Albanian language into North Macedonia's judicial system, dubbing it "an expansionist blast of Albanian nationalism" in favour of the Albanian Democratic Union for Integration, which it considers a "criminal party". The party deemed the law as only increasing the ethnic rift in North Macedonia, which they opined ought to be a country run by a civic nationalism, rather than ethnic nationalism character, which they deem would lead to good inter-ethnic relations. It has come out against what it dubbed a division into Macedonian and Albanian blocs in the country, defining itself as a "supra-ethnic" party.

The Left's political program continues to refer to the country as the Republic of Macedonia instead of the constitutional "Republic of North Macedonia" as negotiated in the Prespa agreement. Balkan Insight has accused The Left of borrowing policies from the far right. In September 2020, the party's leader Apasiev testified at the Public Prosecutor's Office in Skopje after receiving three criminal charges for spreading racial, religious, and ethnic intolerance.

Foreign policy 
The Left has vehemently opposed the Prespa agreement and the renaming of the Republic of Macedonia into the Republic of North Macedonia, instead supporting a state-sponsored international campaign for full UN membership under the country's old name. It has also dismissed the renaming of the country as unconstitutional, and as such should be revoked. It has declared its intention to void the agreement, should it come into power in North Macedonia. It has also announced that it would only take part in a coalition government if that government would renounce the Prespa agreement. The party's main reason for opposing the name change is its feeling that the deal is only intended to bring the country closer to NATO's influence, which they see as an imperialist organisation, as well as saying the deal completely absolves Greece of any past actions against Macedonians.

The Left opposes NATO, which they accuse of starting imperialist wars and of being a threat to world peace. On this basis, it has called for the suspension of accession of North Macedonia to NATO. It has dubbed North Macedonia's foreign minister Nikola Dimitrov's recognition of Juan Guaidó as the interim President of Venezuela as a "typical stance of a vassalistic and subordinate country that has completely lost its sovereignty as an independent state". The party has supported Nicolás Maduro as President of Venezuela, as it considers him democratically elected.

The Left supports for North Macedonia to become a neutral country and a "principle of zero problems with neighbouring countries". The latter it defines as "solving problems without bringing historical baggage", friendly relations with Balkans countries and a principle of self-determination, which they opine gives all people the right to define their own name themselves. The party's leader has stated in an interview that North Macedonia's membership in the European Union might potentially be a positive thing, but that the country should stay out if the cost of membership was a change in its name and identity. In their 2020 general election program, the party put forward the idea that North Macedonia should "withdraw the recognition of the State of Israel, Kosovo, and South Korea", while supporting the independence of the State of Palestine, Catalonia, and the Basque Country. They also suggested a review of the Friendship Agreement between Bulgaria and North Macedonia, as they consider parts of it to amount to historical revisionism and a "rehabilitation of fascism".

The party supports Russia's war in Ukraine, and espouses ultra-nationalist rhetoric about Macedonian-Albanian and Macedonian-Bulgarian relations.

Social and environmental issues 
The Left has opposed the government of Zoran Zaev and his Social Democratic Union of Macedonia (SDSM), accusing them of an "unbecoming attitude" and later of electoral fraud and blackmail. The Left's leader has predicted that SDSM would follow Pasokification. It also opposed the previous government of Nikola Gruevski, whom they consider an "autocrat", as well as his VMRO-DPMNE.

The Left has declared a principled opposition to conservatism, clericalism, and patriarchy. It is supportive of LGBT rights in the country. The party celebrates and organises rallies for the Victory Day over fascism on 9 May, being the only Macedonian political party to organize events for the non-official holiday.

The Left has described North Macedonia as undergoing an "ecological cataclysm", which they consider a direct result of the "political and social catastrophe that is happening to all spheres of daily life". Its electoral program declares support for free healthcare and universal education, and considers neoliberalism and "wild capitalism" to be the root of most of North Macedonia's economic problems. It views healthcare and education, as well as economic growth and organized labour as the "biggest enemies of terrorism" in North Macedonia.

Electoral performance

References 

2015 establishments in the Republic of Macedonia
Anti-imperialist organizations
Left-wing nationalist parties
Left-wing parties
Nationalist parties in North Macedonia
Political parties established in 2015
Secularist organizations
Socialist parties in North Macedonia